Ethel Crowninshield (fl. 1900s – 1940s) was an American children's songwriter. Her 1938 Sing & Play songs were used to teach children to sing until the 1950s and 1960s. The song "The Big Crocodile" is still taught today.

Works
 Mother Goose Songs for Little Ones 1909
 Robert Louis Stevenson Songs, 1910
 The Sing & Play Book first edition, 1938, The Boston Music Company / Clarendon Press Oxford
"Diddle Diddle Dumpling" 1927 
 Stories that Sing, 1944
Individual songs
"Hoo Hoo" or "Yoo Hoo"
"The Big Crocodile"

References

Children's songwriters
Year of birth missing
Year of death missing
American women songwriters